The men's tournament of Ice hockey at the 2011 Asian Winter Games at Astana, Kazakhstan, was held from 28 January to 6 February 2011.

Squads

Results
All times are Almaty Time (UTC+06:00)

Premier division

Top division

Final standing

References 

 IIHF

External links
Official website

Men